The George Randolph Frisbee Jr. House is a historic house located at 2125 Palmetto Street in Middleburg, Florida. It is locally significant as an excellent example of late 19th century vernacular building trends and also as one of the few buildings dating from the early developmental period of the community.

Description and history 
It is a two-story, Frame Vernacular building, with an L-shaped floor plan. It has a steeply-pitched, side gabled roof. The symmetrical main facade is dominated by a two-story, hip roofed porch with chamfered post supports and a balustrade. There is a rear gabled, one-story ell, and a two-story shed roofed addition on the rear elevation. It was added to the National Register of Historic Places on March 9, 1990.

References

External links
 Clay County listings at National Register of Historic Places
 Clay County listings at Florida's Office of Cultural and Historical Programs

National Register of Historic Places in Clay County, Florida
Houses on the National Register of Historic Places in Florida
Houses in Clay County, Florida
Houses completed in 1890
Vernacular architecture in Florida